Stalham railway station was a station in North Norfolk serving the settlement of Stalham. It was on the line between Melton Constable and Great Yarmouth. It is now closed, having been shut in 1959 when the line was closed. The station lay derelict and unused for many years after closure. However the station buildings were dismantled and rebuilt at the new Holt station on the North Norfolk Railway.

References

External links
 Stalham station on navigable 1946 O. S. map

Disused railway stations in Norfolk
Former Midland and Great Northern Joint Railway stations
Railway stations in Great Britain opened in 1880
Railway stations in Great Britain closed in 1959
Stalham